The Anglesey Coastal Path (formally the Isle of Anglesey Coastal Path) is a  long-distance footpath around the island of Anglesey (Ynys Môn) in North Wales. The route is part of the Wales Coast Path.

Description

The  path mainly follows the coast. Exceptions are where the path comes inland from Moel y Don by Plas Newydd estate, and the Bodorgan Estate on the west of the island between Aberffraw and Malltraeth, where the Prince and Princess of Wales used to live. The loop officially begins and ends at Holyhead, and is described in the official guidebook in an anti-clockwise direction. It cost £1.4 million and runs virtually within the length of the entire Area of Outstanding Natural Beauty, using the existing network of public rights of way and some designated permissive paths. For example, the coastal path at Mynachdy is closed between mid-September and mid-February. There are alternatives to these permissive paths. The path is well signposted throughout. It has been walked in as little as four days, but around 7–10 days is a guideline for most walkers aiming to complete the whole path.

European Objective 1 funds have contributed to this project, which aims to meet the perceived growing demand for coastal walking. The path has been created by a partnership led by community agency Menter Môn and the Isle of Anglesey County Council. It was formally opened by Rhodri Morgan AM, the former First Minister of Wales, on 9 June 2006.

Offshoot trails
There are a number of smaller trails very near the coast path, which often take users inland on shorter routes: these include:
Copper Coast circular walk – starts and finishes at Amlwch Port and passes Point Lynas headland and Parys Mountain. It is a lengthy  walk and should take some 6 hours to complete.
The island forms part of the national nature reserve of Newborough Warren which includes the extensive and floristically rich sand dune system. Ynys Llanddwyn is a tidal island and walkers should beware the incoming tide.

Other places on the path

Starting at Holyhead and walking anti-clockwise, the path passes through or near:

References

External links

 
 Long Distance Walkers Association
 Visit Anglesey

Coastal paths in Wales
Recreational walks in Wales
Long-distance footpaths in Wales
Tourist attractions in Anglesey
Coast of Anglesey